Joseph Banner Briggs (4 June 1860 – 1 December 1902) was an English first-class cricketer active 1885–88 who played in seven matches for Nottinghamshire as a slow left arm spin bowler. The elder brother of Johnny Briggs, he was born in Sutton-in-Ashfield; died in Bramley, Leeds.

References

1860 births
1902 deaths
English cricketers
Nottinghamshire cricketers
Cricketers from Sutton-in-Ashfield